Betrayal is violation of trust.

Betrayal or Betrayer may also refer to:

Arts, entertainment, and media

Films
 Betrayal (1929 film), a drama film
 Betrayal (1932 film), a British crime film 
 Betrayal (1974 film), an ABC Movie of the Week starring Amanda Blake and Tisha Sterling
 Betrayal (1978 film), an NBC telemovie starring Lesley Ann Warren and Rip Torn
 Betrayal (1981 film), Norwegian film by Haakon Gundersen
 Betrayal (1983 film), adaptation of Pinter's play directed by David Jones
 Betrayal (1993 film), Romanian film
 Betrayal (2003 film), by Jeffrey Goldenberg and Courtney Joyner
 Betrayal (2009 film), Norwegian film
 Betrayal (2012 film), a Russian film
 The Betrayal (1948 film), an American race film
 The Betrayal (1957 film), a British war film
 The Betrayal – Nerakhoon, by Ellen Kuras and Thavisouk Phrasavath

Games 
Betrayer (video game)
Betrayal at House on the Hill, a board game by Avalon Hill
God of War: Betrayal, a 2007 mobile game
 "The Betrayer", the nickname of the Warcraft character Illidan Stormrage
WWF Betrayal, a 2001 World Wrestling Entertainment video game for the Game Boy Color

Literature
Betrayal: The Final Act of the Trump Show, by Jonathan Karl (2021)
Betrayal (Gertz book), full title:  Betrayal: How the Clinton Administration Undermined American Security, by Bill Gertz
Betrayal (Star Wars novel), a 2006 novel by Aaron Allston
Betrayal (McIntosh novel), the first fantasy novel in the Trinity series published in 2001
Betrayal (Star Trek novel), a 1994 Star Trek: Deep Space Nine novel written by Lois Tilton
Betrayal (Steel novel), a 2012 novel by Danielle Steel
Betrayal, in the Dragonlance realm, by Jean Rabe
Traitors to All or Betrayal, a 1966 novel by Giorgio Scerbanenco
Betrayal: Whitey Bulger and the FBI Agent Who Fought to Bring Him Down, a 2012 book by Robert Fitzpatrick
 Betrayer (novel), a 2011 novel set in C. J. Cherryh's Foreigner universe
The Betrayal (Dunmore novel), a 2010 novel by Helen Dunmore
The Betrayal (Hartley novel), a 1966 novel by L. P. Hartley
The Betrayal, a 1964 novel by Henry Kreisel

Music 
 Betrayal, a 1993 album by Muslimgauze
"Betrayal", a 1983 song by Secession
"Betrayal", a 1980 song by Jah Wobble, from The Legend Lives On... Jah Wobble in "Betrayal"
"The Betrayal (Act III)" and "The Betrayal (Act I)", songs by Nickelback from the album Feed the Machine, 2017

Theatre
 Betrayal (play), a 1978 work by Harold Pinter

Television
 Betrayal (TV series), a 2013 American drama series
 The Betrayal (2022 TV series), a Thai drama series

Episodes
 "Betrayal" (Arrow)
 "Betrayal" (Batman Beyond)
 "Betrayal" (Charlie Jade)
 "Betrayal" (Devious Maids)
 "Betrayal" (The Following)
 "Betrayal" (Lincoln Heights)
 "Betrayal" (Revenge)
 "The Betrayal", an episode of Seinfeld

Other uses
 Western betrayal, the Western powers seeming abandonment of Central European nations to Hitler and Stalin from 1931 to 1945

See also
 Betrayed (disambiguation)
 The Great Betrayal (disambiguation)